Unknown or The Unknown may refer to:

Film
 The Unknown (1915 comedy film), a silent boxing film
 The Unknown (1915 drama film)
 The Unknown (1922 drama film)
 The Unknown (1927 film), a silent horror film starring Lon Chaney
 The Unknown (1936 film), a German drama film
 The Unknown (1946 film), a mystery film
 Anjaane: The Unknown, a 2005 Bollywood horror movie
 The Unknown, a 2005 action/thriller starring Miles O'Keeffe
 Unknown (2006 film), a thriller starring James Caviezel
 Unknown (2011 film), a thriller starring Liam Neeson

Literature
 Unknown (magazine), an American pulp fantasy fiction magazine published from 1939 to 1943
 The Unknown (novel), a 1998 book by K. A. Applegate
 The Unknown, a comic book mini-series by Mark Waid

Music
 The Unknown (Madeline Juno album) (2014)
 Unknown (Rasputina album) (2015)
 The Unknown (The Vision Bleak album) (2016)
 The Unknown, a 2014 album by Dillon
 "The Unknown" (song), by 10 Years, 2019
 "The Unknown", a song by Crossfade from Crossfade, 2004
 "The Unknown", a song by Shadows Fall from Fire from the Sky, 2012
 "Unknown", a song by Reks from The Greatest X, 2016

Science and mathematics
 Unknown (mathematics), a variable that appears in an equation for which a solution is sought
 Unknown, the ongoing answer to an open problem

Video games
 Unknown (video game) or Amnesia: The Dark Descent, a 2010 video game
 Unknown (Tekken), a character in Tekken

Other uses
 The Unknown (Over the Garden Wall), an episode of Over the Garden Wall
 The Unknown, a location in Over the Garden Wall
 The Unknown, a sculpture by Kenny Hunter
 Unknown, a Unicode script
The Unknowns, a self-proclaimed ethical hacking group

People
 Unknown Hinson (born 1954), musician and performer
 The Unknown Comic (born 1945), Canadian actor and comedian
 The Unknown DJ, American disc jockey and record producer
Unknown T (born 1998), British rapper

See also
 The Great Unknown (disambiguation)
 L'Inconnue de la Seine (died c. 1880), unidentified young woman whose death mask was the model for the CPR doll Resusci Anne
 Unknown known
 Unknown Soldier (disambiguation)
 Unown, a Pokémon species